Speke may refer to a number of sailing ships;

 Speke, a ship built in Calcutta in 1789 that made three voyages transporting convicts from Britain to New South Wales.
 Speke, a 2,800-ton sailing ship wrecked at  Phillip Island, Victoria, Australia in 1906.
 , a paddlesteamer built in 1910 for Uganda Railway.

Ship names